Bystrá is a village and municipality in Brezno District, in the Banská Bystrica Region of central Slovakia.

Attractions
The gothic Roman Catholic church of St, Florian is located in the center of the village.

During winter Bystra is mainly popular for ice-skating and winter walks. Until the 2010s Bystra also had its own ski slope. During winter the competition for the tastiest sausage is held in Bystra.

During summer the main touristic attractions are hiking and visits to the caves. There are two caves in Bystra:
 Bystrianska cave
 Cave of dead bats

Notable personalities
František Švantner, writer

Genealogical resources

The records for genealogical research are available at the state archive "Statny Archiv in Banska Bystrica, Slovakia"

 Roman Catholic church records (births/marriages/deaths): 1788-1923 (parish B)

See also
 List of municipalities and towns in Slovakia

References

External links
Surnames of living people in Bystra

Villages and municipalities in Brezno District